CSI: Crime Scene Investigation is a Stern pinball game machine designed by Pat Lawlor and released in November 2008.  It is based on the CSI: Crime Scene Investigation television series.

Reception
Pinball News rates the table a 53/70, noting that "CSI seems like a reasonable theme for a pinball....CSI is much like starting that trip in the home of CSI - Las Vegas.  All the flashy glitz is there from the beginning."

References

External links
 
 Internet Pinball Serial Number Database entry
 Recent Auction Results

CSI: Crime Scene Investigation
Pinball machines based on television series
Stern pinball machines
2008 pinball machines